Ferromex  (syllabic abbreviation of Ferrocarril Mexicano or "Mexican Railway") is a private rail consortium that operates the largest (by mileage) railway in Mexico with combined mileage (Ferromex + Ferrosur) of  and is part of the North American Class I railroads.

Description 
Ferromex began operating on February 19, 1998, following the privatization of most of the government-owned railways by then President of Mexico Ernesto Zedillo Ponce de León. Currently, Grupo México owns 74% and Union Pacific Corporation owns 26% of the company. The Ferromex system operates 9,610 km of Ferromex tracks plus  of Ferrosur tracks.

Passenger services 
Ferromex hosts the Ferrocarril Chihuahua al Pacífico "ChePe" railroad, a tourist line that runs through the Copper Canyon. Ferromex also operates the Tequila Express, which runs from Guadalajara to a tequila distillery in Amatitán.

Merger with Ferrosur 
In November 2005, Grupo México, owner of Ferromex, purchased Infraestructura y Transportes Ferroviarios, the parent company of Ferrosur, another of Mexico's Class I railroads, in a  stock transaction. The Mexican Federal Competition Commission (CFC) had rejected a proposed 2002 merger of Ferromex and Ferrosur amid opposition from Ferromex competitor Grupo Transportación Ferroviaria Mexicana (TFM).

Following the November 2005 purchase of Ferrosur by Grupo México, Kansas City Southern de México (KCSM), successor to TFM, petitioned the Mexican government to block the merger of Ferrosur and Ferromex.  The CFC rejected the merger in June 2006 stating that the merger would have led to excessive concentration in the railway industry to the detriment of consumers and competing shippers. However, in March 2011, a tribunal ruled in Grupo México's favor, and the merger was permitted.

Rolling stock 

In January 2011, Ferromex ordered 44 new SD70ACe locomotives from EMD, its first order since 2006.

Other 
Grupo Mexico Transportes, with Fundacion Grupo México, operates Dr. Vagon, a hospital train that offers free, complete healthcare for hard to reach communities in Mexico.

See also 

 Chihuahua al Pacífico
 List of Mexican railroads
 Rail transport in Mexico
 Tequila Express

References

External links 

 
 MEXLIST - The group for Mexican railway information

Railway companies of Mexico
Railway companies established in 1998
Privatized companies in Mexico
Standard gauge railways in Mexico
Mexican brands
Mexican companies established in 1998